The American Non-Governmental Organizations Coalition for the International Criminal Court (AMICC) leads the civil society movement for full United States participation in the International Criminal Court.

With over 40 member and observer organizations, AMICC is a national coalition made up of US-based non-governmental organizations that works to build support for the International Criminal Court (ICC) in the United States. AMICC is a program of the Columbia University Institute for the Study of Human Rights.

Objectives

AMICC is a coalition of non-governmental organizations committed to achieving full United States support for the International Criminal Court (ICC) and the earliest possible US ratification of the Court's Rome Statute.

The Coalition supports and promotes grassroots activity in support of the Court, including the formation of local alliances of individuals and organizations whose interests will be served and advanced by the ICC and by a positive US relationship with it. The member organizations include bar associations, women's groups, human rights organizations, religious organizations, veterans' groups, victims organizations, students and young adults, and others. These organizations may have sharply differing views on other political and social issues, but hold that the ICC expresses and implements values traditionally championed by the United States, including international justice and the rule of law.  Together they work effectively to promote a Court which implements their common intense opposition to international atrocities and to holding accountable those most responsible for them.

AMICC Membership

Current AMICC Members

Advocates for Survivors of Trauma and Torture (ASTT)
American Bar Association Section of International Law 
American Humanist Association (AHA) 
American Jewish Committee/ Jacob Blaustein Institute for the Advancement of Human Rights 
Amnesty International USA 
Baha'is of the United States 
Church World Service 
Citizens for Global Solutions 
Coalition for the International Criminal Court (CICC) 
Council for American Students in International Negotiations (CASIN) 
DePaul University College of Law International Human Rights Law Institute International Human Rights Law Institute 
Evangelical Lutheran Church in America
Fellowship of Reconciliation
Feminist Majority Foundation 
Human Rights First (formerly Lawyers Committee for Human Rights) 
Human Rights Watch 
Imani Works
International Committee on Offensive Microwave Weapons 
International Federation of Women Lawyers 
Lawyers' Committee on Nuclear Policy 
Maryknoll Fathers, Brothers, Sisters and Lay Missioners 
National Association of Criminal Defense Lawyers (NACDL)
National Lawyers Guild, International Committee
National Service Conference of the American Ethical Union 
Philadelphia Bar Association 
Presbyterian Church (USA)
Unitarian Universalist Association 
United Church of Christ 
United Methodist Church
United Nations Association of the United States of America 
Veterans for Peace 
Washington Kurdish Institute 
Women's International League for Peace and Freedom (WILPF), US Section

OBSERVERS

Commission on Social Action of Reform Judaism
US Fund for UNICEF 
Women's Initiatives for Gender Justice 
Women's Bar Association of the State of New York

Local AMICC Alliances

AMICC's Local Alliances for the ICC advocate full U.S. participation in the ICC, and the earliest possible ratification of the Rome Statute.  Through broad alliances of the legal, academic, human rights and faith-based communities, they coordinate activities in the support of the Court and act as a resource for those seeking information about the movement for the ICC.

LOCAL ALLIANCES

Arkansas

California

Los Angeles - ICC Alliance (ICCA)

San Francisco

Illinois

Chicago Alliance for the ICC (CAICC)

Indiana

Iowa

Kentucky

Kentuckians for the ICC

Maine

Maine Alliance for the ICC (MAICC)

Minnesota

Missouri

St. Louis

New Mexico

New York

Brooklyn

Texas

Austin

Dallas

San Antonio

The Faith and Ethics Network for the ICC

The United States Faith and Ethics Network for the International Criminal Court (US FENICC) is a coalition of religious and interfaith NGOs that examine the moral, ethical and religious considerations surrounding the Court. Religious organizations have a special role to play in raising awareness at the grassroots level and helping to shape the ICC. The Network promotes the ICC by disseminating information about the Court to respective religious, ecumenical, and ethical communities. 
To inform others about some of the moral, ethical and religious considerations involved in the ICC, the Network holds frequent group meetings and plans events that will bring these issues to the attention of a wider audience. The issues that the group raises and decides upon will impact the role the court will play and the way it is perceived around the world. The following issues are among those that have been and will be discussed by the working group in their meetings as well as in their open events and dialogues: 
moral, ethical and theological imperatives and the importance of the ICC as a powerful representation of these values; moral, political and ethical dimensions of impunity, reconciliation, and long term peace building; individual and collective healing in society; redressive justice relationships between confession, repentance, compensation and forgiveness issues of psychological and spiritual rehabilitation.

Current member organizations

Al-Khoei Foundation
American Humanist Association
Baha'is of the United States
Church World Service
Conference of Major Superiors of Men
Evangelical Lutheran Church in America
Fellowship of Reconciliation
Jacob Blaustein Institute for the Advancement of Human Rights of the American Jewish Committee
The Loretto Community
Maryknoll Office for Global Concerns
National Council of Churches of Christ in the USA
National Service Conference of the American Ethical Union
Presbyterian Church, USA
Religious of the Sacred Heart
Soka Gakkai International
Temple of Understanding
Unitarian Universalist Association
General Board of Church and Society of the United Methodist Church
World Council of Churches

See also
United States and the International Criminal Court
International Criminal Court
International Criminal Law
Command responsibility
Criminal law
Human rights
International law
Coalition for the International Criminal Court

External links
Official website 
Coalition for the International Criminal Court, international counterpart to AMICC

Human rights organizations based in the United States
International Criminal Court